Brierley Hill railway station was a station on the Oxford-Worcester-Wolverhampton Line serving the town of Brierley Hill in England.

History
It was opened in 1858. British Rail closed the station in 1962. Two railways/routes served the station - originally the Oxford, Worcester and Wolverhampton Railway and the South Staffordshire Railway, which later became the Great Western Railway and London, Midland and Scottish Railway (through amalgamation of the London and North Western Railway) respectively.

Today's usage
The station's pedestrian entrance from Station Road is still in existence, though it has long been blocked off by a fence.

Today, Goods trains still use the track where the station once stood, on their way to the nearby Round Oak Steel Terminal.

Re-opening
In January 2012, plans were announced to run a passenger service between Stourbridge Junction and Brierley Hill, with stations being re-opened along the route, including Brierley Hill. The service would be operated by railcars built by Parry People Movers, who built the Class139 units which run the Stourbridge Town service.
Another plan is for the entire line to re-open the South Staffs Line with passenger and freight trains between Stourbridge and Walsall.

In late 2015 plans emerged to re-open the Dudley Port railway station to Stourbridge line as the fact of trams serving on the same line as freight trains became extremely unlikely, but ongoing negotiations between Network Rail and Midlands Metro Alliance is for freight to run from Walsall to Round Oak Steelworks while there is a chance the trams will be Tram-Trains.

West Midlands Trains has plans within its franchise bid to reopen the line from Stourbridge Junction to Canal Street tram stop via Stourbridge Town and Brierley Hill by December 2023.

References

Further reading

External links
Rail Around Birmingham and the West Midlands: Brierley Hill railway station

Disused railway stations in Dudley
Railway stations in Great Britain opened in 1858
Railway stations in Great Britain closed in 1962
Brierley Hill
Former Great Western Railway stations